Oscar Nathan Harris (November 6, 1939 – January 28, 2020) was an American accountant, businessman, and politician who served as a member of the North Carolina Senate from 1998 to 2002.

Early life and education 
Born in Newton Grove, North Carolina, Harris graduated from Campbell University.

Career 
Harris served in the United States Marine Corps from 1958 to 1961 and in the United States Marine Corps Reserve from 1961 to 1966. Harris served as the mayor of Dunn, North Carolina, from 1987 to 1995 and again from 2003 to 2019. He was a member of the North Carolina Senate from 1998 to 2002. Harris was a Democrat. Harris was the campaign treasurer for Governor Bev Perdue. He also ran an accounting firm in Dunn before it merged with another company in 2017.

Personal life 
Harris was married and had two children. He died at home on January 28, 2020, at the age of 80.

References

1939 births
2020 deaths
Businesspeople from North Carolina
Campbell University alumni
Mayors of places in North Carolina
Military personnel from North Carolina
Democratic Party North Carolina state senators
People from Dunn, North Carolina
People from Sampson County, North Carolina
United States Marines